Hangover drinks are drinks sold in South Korea that are consumed to ease the hangover after heavy drinking. They are typically consumed before drinking alcohol and are popular due to the prevalence of social drinking in Korea. Alcohol consumption is prevalent and contributes to a critical part of entertainment culture in Korea. Despite efforts to decrease alcohol intake, an increasing trend has been observed worldwide for alcohol consumption. In Korea, people consumed a remarkable amount of alcohol, with an average of 10.2 L per year (Sang Young Kim, & Hyun Ja Kim., 2021). Hangover drinks in Korea are consumed before a massive drinking moment, and ingredients in it are said to break down the toxin produced by your liver and reduce the impact of alcohol on the neurotransmitters in your brain. Primary ingredients tend to derive from traditional Korean medicine, including ingredients such as Asian pear and Japanese raisin. Japanese raisin trees have long been a part of Japanese, Chinese, and Korean medicine.

Effects 

A hangover refers to a set of symptoms that occur because of drinking too much. The symptoms of a hangover demonstrate a wide variation in expression and severity. The most commonly experienced symptoms of hangover include tiredness (95.5%), increased thirst (89.1%), sleepiness (87.7%), headache (87.2%), dry mouth (83%), and nausea (81%; Penning, Mckinney, & Verster, 2012). The ingredients added to a hangover drink suppresses alcohol absorption. It also promotes alcohol metabolism, reducing alcohol concentration in the blood. It is also known to represent the function of protecting liver cells from alcohol and preventing gastrointestinal mucosa damage and protecting the stomach by applying gastrointestinal mucosa. Asian pear juice is an effective hangover deterrent; other research suggests red ginseng and lemon-lime soda can help metabolize alcohol more quickly. Plenty of Koreans admit that the products offer little more than a placebo effect—but they buy them anyway, because it's part of the bonding experience.

Market growth 

The term Haejanghada is the practice of getting over a hangover. In Korea, refusing to drink is not a polite gesture in Korean society. Thus, the size of the Korean hangover-release market is steadily growing. In 1998, drinks recorded about 20 billion won in sales. In 2006, more than 60 billion. The size of the Korean hangover-release market is steadily growing. According to market research firm Link Aztec, the market size of the hangover solution market as of 2016 has been steadily increasing by 15 percent every year to 135.3 billion won in 2015, 155.7 billion won in 2016 and 174.8 billion won in 2017. The reason for the increase in market size is that the existing consumers in their 30s and 40s are spreading to those in their 20s, with the aim of relieving hangovers after drinking and camouflage protection. Currently, CJ Hutgae's market share is at the forefront with about 44 percent of CJ Hutgae condition, followed by Grammy's dawn 808 with about 32 percent. And Dong-A Pharmaceutical's Morning Power settled for third place with about 14.

Product form 

In addition to beverages, hangover remedies are also sold in jelly, candy, and Hwan forms. Starting with CJ's condition (1992), the beverage was released in the order of Dawn 808 (1998), Dong-A Morning Care (2005), ReadyQ (2014), and Jeonggwanjang (369 (2015). RU21 (2007) and God of dining (2013) were released as hangover pills, but they did not surpass the market for hangover drinks. Changes have occurred as CJ conditionhwan (2012) was released in markets for hangover remover, which had been dominated by drinks. Later, changes began in earnest with the release of Samyang Foods' Sangkwaehwan. Since then, it has diversified into powdered 우콘군부탁해 (2013), candy-type kisslip (2013), and jelly-type Korean-German ready-q-chew.

Among the hangover remover of beverages, jelly, candy, and fantasy shapes, the quickest is the hangover remover in the type of drink. Common sense is that a hangover in the form of a drink will have the fastest effect, said Kim Jin-wook. In the form of a beverage, if the hangover remover is already dissolved, it can be absorbed immediately.

Trend 

In 1992, Korea's first drink marketed exclusively for hangovers with little buzz. Koreans, who were well-accustomed to heavy drinking without any supplemental support, continued to turn to the tried-and-true powers of their favorite foods: meaty, oily stews like haejangguk—literally "hangover soup." But with Korea's emerging focus on wellness trends, anti-hangover drinks gained popularity. The recent trend of consumption of hangover-release in Korea is reflecting a change in consciousness.(2019) It's called "Nasimbi." In the past, the older generation in Korea placed importance on the sense of community "we," but recently, super-individualism that values "I"'s own satisfaction is rapidly under way. And that change is reflected in many industries as well as the hangover market. As a concrete example, people have increased interest in healthy eating and "health" such as drinking alone and home drinking. For his health, more customers are looking for a hangover product even though he drank a little. In addition, the value of consumer spending, which happily opens its purse to slightly more expensive products for health, is expanding. This trend is now further driving growth in the hangover and beverage market.

Research 

According to Korean market research, about two-thirds of Koreans regularly rely on these remedies. Many studies have researched trends in daily alcohol consumption over time and examined its trends regarding variables and alcoholic beverage types. For example, a study shown alcohol intake was highest in men aged 30–49 years and women aged 19–29 years. The evidence suggests that several products are capable of significantly improving some, but not all, of the symptoms related to alcohol hangover. Therefore, further research is necessary to develop clinically effective hangover treatments. (Jayawardena, R., Thejani, T., Ranasinghe, P., Fernando, D., & Verster, J. C. (2017)

See also 

 Ampelopsin
Drinking culture of Korea
Korean alcoholic beverages

References

Drinking culture
South Korean drinks